Joaquín Prieto Vial (August 20, 1786 – November 22, 1854) was a Chilean military and political figure. He was twice President of Chile between 1831 and 1841. Joaquín Prieto was of Spanish and Basque descent.

Early life
Prieto was one of five sons of a Creole officer in Concepción. After finishing school, he joined the cavalry garrison in his home town. In 1810, he joined the Chilean fight for independence against his father's will. He met Manuela Warnes García de Zúñiga in Buenos Aires and married her in 1812. During the Chilean War of Independence, he served as a captain. In the dispute between Bernardo O'Higgins and José Miguel Carrera, he took the side of O'Higgins, who then made him Quartermaster general of the southern army.

After the defeat in the Battle of Rancagua, which he wasn't a part of, Prieto fled to Mendoza, Argentina to build up the Liberation Army of the Andes. After the victory of the Chileans in the battle of Chacabuco in 1817, in which he also wasn't involved, he was appointed Commanding General of Santiago, where he dealt with defense strategies and military matters. Then, he turned his attention to Peru, in order to support its fight for independence.

His military accomplishments - especially in the south of the country - earned the respect of conservative-centralist circles, which encouraged him to start a political career. He did so in 1823; in this year he was elected into the Chilean House of Deputies and appointed into State council. In this position, he advocated a strong and influential central government and fought the federalist independence ambitions of the regionalists. In 1828, he was elected vice-president of Chile.

Political career and Civil War of 1829

Prieto's military career continued to progress. In 1828, he was promoted to general and commander of the army in the south. In 1829 presidential elections, neither he nor his liberal-federalist opponent Joaquín Vicuña received an absolute majority. The liberal majority in Congress nominated Francisco Ramón Vicuña, president of the senate, as vice-president. The conservatives considered this move to be unconstitutional and started a civil war.

As commander of the southern army, Prieto Vial marched onto Santiago. On December 14, 1829, he and his troops met the liberal army under Francisco de la Lastra and defeated them at the Battle of Ochagavía. Then, in 1830, an agreement was finally found after the defeat of Ramón Freire at the Battle of Lircay.

Administration

After the transitional president José Tomás Ovalle died, Fernando Errázuriz Aldunate became Provisional President from March 8 to March 31, 1831, rapidly replaced by Prieto himself on April 10. On September 18, 1831, Prieto was finally able to take over the job as elected president for a first term of five years.

His main focus on first taking power was to restore law and order; for that he relied on Diego Portales, who continue to be the almost universal minister and provided the necessary political stability for the country to recover from the decade of anarchy. He also instructed Manuel Bulnes to seize the bandits commanded by the brothers Pablo and José Antonio Pincheira who made the area around Concepción unsafe. On May 25, 1833 a new constitution was passed, which - with a few amendments - would be valid until 1925. It provided for a 5-year long term of office for the president, who could be re-elected only once. The president received much authority.

During his 10-year-long presidency, Prieto expanded the governmental power and laid the foundation for a public administration in Chile. The first educational establishments like the Instituto Nacional were founded and in 1837 the ministries for justice and public education were created. Prieto's foreign policy was dominated by Chile's war with Peru between 1836 and 1839. The Chilean army under Manuel Blanco Encalada suffered heavy losses, which climaxed in the Treaty of Paucarpata, following which Manuel Bulnes took over the leadership of the army and led it into the victorious Battle of Yungay.

Cabinet

Later life
In 1841, the victorious hero Bulnes was elected as the successor of Prieto. After his resignation Prieto served as Senator until 1852 and even took over the command of the infantry and the navy of Valparaíso until 1846. In 1846, he moved to Santiago de Chile, where he died on November 22, 1854 at the age of 68.

References

Official biography (in Spanish)

1786 births
1854 deaths
People from Concepción, Chile
Presidents of Chile
Members of the Senate of Chile
Members of the Chamber of Deputies of Chile
Chilean Army generals
Chilean people of Basque descent
Chilean people of French descent
Chilean people of Spanish descent
People of the Chilean Civil War of 1829–30
People of the War of the Confederation
Chilean Navy officers
Conservative Party (Chile) politicians
Candidates for President of Chile